Pegadungan is an administrative village in the Kalideres district of Indonesia. It is in the province of Jakarta. Its postal code is 11830.

See also 
 Kalideres
 List of administrative villages of Jakarta

West Jakarta
Administrative villages in Jakarta